Minnetoğlu Mehmed Bey (1463–64) was an Ottoman Bosnian general and the first governor of the Sanjak of Bosnia, serving Sultan Mehmed II. He was of Bosniak origin.

Minnetoğlu participated in the Bosnian campaign led by Sultan Mehmed in 1463–64 (1460–61 according to chronicler Tursun Beg). According to some Bosnian sources he was at that time the governor of the Sanjak of Smederevo, or "lord of the Serbian land", however, other sources treat general Ali Bey Mihaloğlu as the sanjak-bey of Smederevo, appointed in 1462–63. When the sultan left the siege of Jajce to march against retreating Hungarians, Minnetoğlu was placed in charge of the siege. After the second siege in 1463 or 1464, the sultan appointed Minnetoğlu as the first sanjak-bey (provincial governor) of the Sanjak of Bosnia, at first seated at Jajce (later Sarajevo). Minnetoğlu sent 500 cavalry to the Ottoman camp at Zvornik, fighting the besieging Hungarians. Isa-Beg Ishaković succeeded him as Bosnian governor.

Sultan Mehmed settled Turks from Amasya into Rumelia under the leadership of Minnetoğlu.

Endowments
A mosque near where the Latin Bridge in Sarajevo was later built.
Konuş Hisarı, a bedestan and imaret at Tatar-Pazarcığı from where the town of Pazardzhik in Bulgaria evolved.

References

Sources

15th-century people from the Ottoman Empire
Military personnel of the Ottoman Empire
15th-century births
15th-century deaths
Governors of the Ottoman Empire
Mehmed the Conqueror